John L. Thompson (22 July 1892 – 1 October 1969) was an English footballer who played for Sheffield United and Bristol City in the Football League.

Playing career 
Thompson initially gained prominence playing for Scunthorpe & Lindsey United, prompting the football committee at Bramall Lane(who oversaw all team affairs at this stage) to bring him to Sheffield United at the start of the 1914–15 season. With a settled side already in place he found it difficult to break into the first team and with the outbreak of war he was the first United player to join up for active duty, serving with the Royal Engineers.  After the war he continued to make sporadic appearances for the Blades until 1920 when he asked to be transferred to a club in the south of the country for personal reasons.

He was duly signed by Bristol City for £500. He stayed there for two years before joining Bath City.

Post football 
Following his retirement from playing he became a cinema manager in Treharris until 1939 after which he worked for J. S. Fry & Sons, the chocolate manufacturer where he trained the company football team.  He died in Bath in 1969 following a car accident.

References 

1892 births
1969 deaths
People from Redcar
Footballers from Yorkshire
English footballers
Association football outside forwards
South Bank F.C. players
Scunthorpe United F.C. players
Sheffield United F.C. players
Bristol City F.C. players
Bath City F.C. players
English Football League players
Royal Engineers soldiers
Road incident deaths in England
British Army personnel of World War I